Banestan (also Romanized as Banestān) is a village in Banestan Rural District of Asfyj District of Behabad County, Yazd province, Iran. At the 2006 National Census, its population was 318 in 90 households, when it was in Behabad District of Bafq County. The following census in 2011 counted 736 people in 252 households, by which time the district had been elevated to county status and divided into two districts. The latest census in 2016 showed a population of 706 people in 231 households; it was the largest village in its rural district.

References 

Behabad County

Populated places in Yazd Province

Populated places in Behabad County